Bradley is a town in Penobscot County, Maine, United States. It is part of the Bangor Metropolitan Statistical Area. The population was 1,532 at the 2020 census. The village of Bradley is in the northwest corner of the town.

History
Bradley was incorporated as a town in 1834, with lumbering and sawmilling as the principal industries.  It was named for Bradley Blackman, an early settler. By the 1850s the town had 14 single-saw mills, three gang-saw (multiple-saw) mills, four clapboard mills, four lath mills, and three shingle mills.  The only village was at Greatworks. The Maine Forest & Logging Museum, located at Leonard's Mills, was established in 1960 to preserve the logging history of Maine.

Geography

Demographics

2010 census
At the 2010 census there were 1,492 people, 625 households, and 411 families living in the town. The racial makeup of the town was 97.3% White, 0.1% African American, 1.5% Native American, 0.3% Asian, 0.1% from other races, and 0.7% from two or more races. Hispanic or Latino of any race were 0.3%.

Of the 625 households 30.6% had children under the age of 18 living with them, 49.9% were married couples living together, 10.9% had a female householder with no husband present, 5.0% had a male householder with no wife present, and 34.2% were non-families. 25.1% of households were one person and 9.5% were one person aged 65 or older. The average household size was 2.39 and the average family size was 2.82.

The median age in the town was 40 years. 21.9% of residents were under the age of 18; 8.2% were between the ages of 18 and 24; 26.8% were from 25 to 44; 28.3% were from 45 to 64; and 14.7% were 65 or older. The gender makeup of the town was 48.9% male and 51.1% female.

2000 census
At the 2000 census there were 1,242 people, 514 households, and 363 families living in the town.  The population density was 25.1 people per square mile (9.7/km).  There were 614 housing units at an average density of 12.4 per square mile (4.8/km).  The racial makeup of the town was 98.47% White, 0.16% African American, 0.40% Native American, 0.08% Asian, 0.08% Pacific Islander, 0.40% from other races, and 0.40% from two or more races. Hispanic or Latino of any race were 0.64%.

Of the 514 households 30.9% had children under the age of 18 living with them, 59.5% were married couples living together, 6.6% had a female householder with no husband present, and 29.2% were non-families. 22.0% of households were one person and 7.2% were one person aged 65 or older.  The average household size was 2.42 and the average family size was 2.81.

The age distribution was 21.9% under the age of 18, 7.6% from 18 to 24, 32.6% from 25 to 44, 23.6% from 45 to 64, and 14.3% 65 or older.  The median age was 39 years. For every 100 females, there were 96.8 males.  For every 100 females age 18 and over, there were 94.8 males.

The median household income was $37,163 and the median family income  was $41,417. Males had a median income of $30,647 versus $21,359 for females. The per capita income for the town was $18,009.  About 5.8% of families and 9.3% of the population were below the poverty line, including 11.4% of those under age 18 and 7.9% of those age 65 or over.

References

External links
 Town of Bradley official website

Towns in Penobscot County, Maine
Towns in Maine
Logging communities in the United States